Patrick O'Regan may refer to:

 Patrick O'Regan (bishop) (born 1958), Australian Roman Catholic bishop
 Patrick O'Regan (politician) (1869–1947), New Zealand politician